The Lowndes County School District is a public school district in Lowndes County, Georgia, United States, based in Valdosta. It serves the communities of Clyattville, Dasher, Hahira, Lake Park, Moody Air Force Base, Naylor, Remerton, and Valdosta.

Schools
The Lowndes County School District has seven elementary schools, three middle schools, and one high school.

Elementary schools
Clyattville Elementary School
Dewar Elementary School
Hahira Elementary School
Lake Park Elementary School
Moulton-Branch Elementary School
Pine Grove Elementary School
Westside Elementary School (located on the grounds of the former Westside High School)

Middle schools
Hahira Middle School
Lowndes Alternative Middle School
Lowndes Middle School
Pine Grove Middle School

High school
Lowndes Alternative High School
Lowndes High School

References

External links

School districts in Georgia (U.S. state)
Education in Lowndes County, Georgia